Tentacle Ridge is a long partially ice-free ridge lying south of Mount Longhurst, extending from the mouth of McCleary Glacier southeast along the north side of Darwin Glacier. The descriptive name was given by the Darwin Glacier Party of the Commonwealth Trans-Antarctic Expedition (1956–58).

Further reading 
 M. A. Bradshaw and F. J. Harmsen, The paleoenvironmental significance of trace fossils in Devonian sediments (Taylor Group), Darwin  Mountains to the Dry Valleys, southern Victoria Land, U. S. Geological Survey and The National Academies; USGS OF-2007-1047, P 3

References 

Ridges of Oates Land